Hypsopanchax is a genus of poeciliids native to freshwater habitats in Middle Africa.

Species
There are currently 6 recognized species in this genus:

 Hypsopanchax catenatus Radda, 1981 (Chain lampeye)
 Hypsopanchax jobaerti Poll & J. G. Lambert, 1965
 Hypsopanchax jubbi Poll & J. G. Lambert, 1965 (Southern deepbody)
 Hypsopanchax platysternus (Nichols & Griscom, 1917) (Zaire lampeye)
 Hypsopanchax stiassnyae van der Zee, Sonnenberg & Mbimbi, 2015 
 Hypsopanchax zebra (Pellegrin, 1929) (Zebra lampeye)

References

 

 
Freshwater fish genera
Ray-finned fish genera
Poeciliidae
Taxa named by George S. Myers
Taxonomy articles created by Polbot